The Gill is a   nature reserve  north of Goudhurst in Kent, England. It is managed by the Kent Wildlife Trust.

This site has been planted with sweet chestnut, which dominates most of it. Flora includes bluebells, early purple orchids and marsh-marigold.

Public access is via prior arrangement.

References

Kent Wildlife Trust